The 1992 Team Ice Racing World Championship was the 14th edition of the Team World Championship. The final was held on 8/9 February, 1992, in Oulu, Finland. The Soviet Union had disbanded and raced as the Commonwealth of Independent States.

Final classification

Semi-final 
Gallio, Veneto - 18/19 January

Semi-final 
Karlstad - 25/26 January

See also 
 1992 Individual Ice Speedway World Championship
 1992 Speedway World Team Cup in classic speedway
 1992 Individual Speedway World Championship in classic speedway

References 

Ice speedway competitions
World